Joost Ebergen (born 2 June 1990) is a Dutch retired footballer who currently works as a player agent.

Club career
Ebergen played in the TOP Oss youth system and signed professional terms with N.E.C. in 2009. He was immediately loaned to Eerste Divisie side FC Oss and joined them permanently the next season.

He quit professional football in 2012 to focus on a social career and after playing a few seasons in amateur football, he quit altogether in 2017 due to persisting injuries and to continue his job as a player agent.

References

External links
Profile

1990 births
Living people
Sportspeople from Oss
Association football defenders
Dutch footballers
NEC Nijmegen players
TOP Oss players
Eerste Divisie players
Dutch sports agents
Association football agents
Footballers from North Brabant
21st-century Dutch people